Look Sharp! is the second studio album by Swedish pop duo Roxette, released on 21 October 1988 by EMI, two years after their debut Pearls of Passion (1986). It was recorded at EMI Studios in Stockholm and at Trident II Studios in London between March and September 1988. The album was an immediate commercial success in Sweden, debuting at number one and eventually being certified 6× platinum there.

Although commercial success elsewhere was initially modest, the album was the duo's international breakthrough. It went on to be certified platinum or multi-platinum in numerous territories, while four of its singles attained commercial success. In the United States, the album was certified platinum and the singles "The Look" and "Listen to Your Heart" both topped the Billboard Hot 100, while "Dangerous" and "Dressed for Success" reached numbers 2 and 14, respectively, on the same chart.

Background and release 
"Dressed for Success" and "Listen to Your Heart" were released as the album's first two singles in Sweden, with Per Gessle and EMI choosing to highlight Marie Fredriksson as Roxette's lead vocalist. They were immediate hits in Sweden, peaking at numbers two and three, respectively. "Chances" was released as the album's first single in France, Germany and Italy, but it failed to chart.

"The Look" was released as the album's fourth single in January 1989, becoming another top 10 hit in their home country. While studying there, an American exchange student from Minneapolis, Dean Cushman, purchased the album and brought it home, giving a copy of it to his local Top 40 radio station, KDWB 101.3 FM. "The Look" quickly became popular, and the station began distributing the track to their sister radio operations. EMI America had previously rejected the duo as unsuitable for the American market, and Roxette did not have a recording contract there.

"The Look" had already entered the top 50 of the Billboard Hot 100 before the duo began official promotion. It would go on to peak at number one eight weeks later. It gradually became a global hit over the next year, topping the charts in 25 countries. It also spent six weeks at number one on the Australian Singles Chart. The album's previous singles—excluding "Chances"—were re-released internationally. Roxette would go on to have four number ones on the Billboard Hot 100, including "Listen to Your Heart"; while the album's final single, "Dangerous", peaked at number two.

Critical reception 

The album received mixed reviews from critics. In a retrospective review, AllMusic complimented its singles, but said that the album tracks "aren't necessarily filler, but they also aren't as strong as many of the cuts that made up Roxette albums that followed. [...] Only 'Chances' and 'Shadow of a Doubt' show glimmers of the skills the duo would soon flourish." A review for Los Angeles Times echoed a similar sentiment, praising its singles and "Shadow of a Doubt"—along with "Cry"—but said that: "the problem is that most of Look Sharp!s music is of such a light, ephemeral nature that it disappears without a trace the minute the record leaves the turntable. Looks like Roxette's forte is pop music that is prettily presented but totally disposable."

Accolades 
Roxette were nominated for two Grammis Awards—the Swedish equivalent of the Grammy Awards—in 1989, for Artist of the Year and Best Pop/Rock Group. Fredriksson and Gessle each won an award for Best Pop/Rock Female and Best Composer, respectively. Both Roxette and Fredriksson won numerous Rockbjörnen awards during this period. They were awarded Best Swedish Album and Best Swedish Group at the 1988 ceremony, and won the latter award again the following year. Fredriksson won the award for Best Swedish Female over four consecutive years, from 1986 to 1989.

Commercial performance 
Look Sharp! was an immediate commercial success in Sweden, selling over 140,000 copies within ten days of release. It spent seven weeks at number one, and was certified platinum in the country for shipments in excess of 100,000 units. In the US, the album was certified platinum on 20 January 1990 by the RIAA for shipments in excess of one million units. As of 2009, it sold 408,000 copies there since Nielsen SoundScan began tracking sales data in May 1991. It peaked at number four in the UK, where it spent over a year on the charts. It was certified platinum by the BPI in December 1990 for sales in excess of 300,000. As of 2001, Look Sharp! had sold over 9 million copies worldwide.

Track listing

Personnel 
Credits adapted from the liner notes of Look Sharp!.

 Roxette are Per Gessle and Marie Fredriksson
 Recorded at EMI Studios, Stockholm, Sweden and Trident II Studios, London, England
 Remastered by Alar Suurna at Polar Studio, Stockholm (2009 reissue)
 All songs published by Jimmy Fun Music, except: "Dance Away", "Cry" and "Half a Woman, Half a Shadow" published by Shock the Music/Jimmy Fun Music

Musicians
Marie Fredriksson – lead and background vocals, piano, keyboards, mixing
Per Gessle – lead and background vocals, mixing
 Per "Pelle" Alsing – drums and hi-hat
 Erik Borelius – Spanish guitar
 Graham Edwards – bass guitar (tracks 6, 7 and 10)
 Erik Häusler – saxophone (track 3)
 Anders Herrlin – background vocals, bass guitar, engineering, programming
 Jonas Isacsson – electric and acoustic guitars
 Henrik Janson – talkbox (track 8)
 Jarl "Jalle" Lorensson – harmonica (track 8)
 Adam McCulloch – saxophone (tracks 6 and 10)
 Morris Michael – electric and acoustic guitars (tracks 6, 7 and 10)
 Adam Moseley – engineering, production (tracks 6, 7 and 10)
 Clarence Öfwerman – background vocals, keyboards, programming, production
 Jan "Janne" Oldaeus – slide guitar
 Alar Suurna – engineering, mixing
 Andrew Wright – keyboards, programming (tracks 6, 7 and 10)

Technical
 Julian Adair – production assistant (tracks 6, 7 and 10)
 Kjell Andersson – sleeve design, executive producer
 Carl Bengtsson – photography
 Lennart Haglund – engineering assistant
 Mikael Jansson – photography
 Rolf Nygren – executive producer
 Pär Wickholm – sleeve design

Charts

Weekly charts

Year-end charts

Certifications and sales

References

External links 
 
 

1988 albums
Albums produced by Adam Moseley
EMI Records albums
Roxette albums